Stefan Bozhilov Stefanov (20 September 1923 – 1 February 2014) was a Bulgarian football player and coach. He usually played the position of midfielder.

Career
Born in Sofia, Bozhkov first started to play for a local team Sportist Hadzhi Dimitar. He made his debut on 20 September 1938, on his 15th birthday, in a game against Fortuna. During his club career he played for PFC CSKA Sofia. Bozhkov won the top Bulgarian league, the A PFG, a ten times (all with CSKA), as well as the Bulgarian Cup, three times (all with CSKA). He earned 53 caps and scored 4 goals for the Bulgaria national football team from 1946 to 1958, and won a bronze medal at the 1956 Summer Olympics. He later coached the national team in the 1970 FIFA World Cup and won a silver medal at the 1968 Summer Olympics.

Honours

International
Bulgaria
Olympic Bronze Medal: 1956

References

External links

 Profile

1923 births
2014 deaths
Bulgarian footballers
Bulgarian football managers
SK Kladno players
PFC CSKA Sofia players
First Professional Football League (Bulgaria) players
Footballers at the 1952 Summer Olympics
Footballers at the 1956 Summer Olympics
Olympic footballers of Bulgaria
Olympic bronze medalists for Bulgaria
1970 FIFA World Cup managers
Bulgaria international footballers
Bulgaria national football team managers
PFC CSKA Sofia managers
Olympic medalists in football
Medalists at the 1968 Summer Olympics
Medalists at the 1956 Summer Olympics
Olympic silver medalists for Bulgaria
Association football midfielders